Joseph Mary Cataldo S.J. (March 17, 1837 – April 9, 1928) was an Italian-American Jesuit priest, a pioneer missionary in the inland Pacific Northwest, who also founded Gonzaga University in Spokane, Washington.

Born in 1837 in Terrasini in the Kingdom of the Two Sicilies, Cataldo was admitted to the Jesuit novitiate in Palermo, Sicily on December 22, 1852.  After ordination, he  was sent to the foreign mission in the Rocky Mountains in the United States.  Due to ill health, Cataldo was then sent to Panama and later to Santa Clara College in Santa Clara, California.  After his recovery, he was then sent north to minister to the Spokane Indians.  He was later made superior of the Rocky Mountain mission which included the Spokane.

Cataldo then opened a small schoolhouse at Saint Michael's Mission where both Native American and white students attended. In order to expand the mission, he was able to purchase two parcels of land totalling  for $936. This location became the site for the Jesuit scholasticate Mount Saint Michael. In 1881, Cataldo was encouraged to use the second parcel of land for the establishment of a college to serve the growing Catholic population in the area. It was here that Cataldo established Gonzaga College, now Gonzaga University.

Cataldo never retired; into his 90s he served the Nez Perce people at Slickpoo near Kamiah, Idaho. He died at age 92 at the Umatilla Indian Reservation, east of Pendleton, Oregon, on April 9, 1928.

References

External links 
Gonzaga History 1887-1895 - Gonzaga University

19th-century American Jesuits
20th-century American Jesuits
Religious leaders from the Province of Palermo
1837 births
1928 deaths
Kingdom of the Two Sicilies emigrants to the United States
Gonzaga University
People from Terrasini
University and college founders